Macroxiphus is a small genus of bush crickets or katydids distributed in Southeast Asia and Micronesia. The nymphs (immature stages) of the insects mimic ants.

Species
Species include:
Macroxiphus nasicornis Pictet, 1888 - type species
Macroxiphus sumatranus (Haan, 1843)

Camouflage and mimicry
Young instars of Macroxiphus, such as M. sumatranus, have an "uncanny resemblance" to ants, extending to their black coloration, remarkably perfect antlike shape, and convincingly antlike behaviour. Their long antennae are camouflaged to appear short, being black only at the base, and they are vibrated like ant antennae. Larger instars suddenly change into typical-looking katydids, and are entirely nocturnal, while the adult has bright warning coloration.

References

Conocephalinae
Tettigoniidae genera